Onan Orlando Thom (born April 11, 1984) is a Guyanese former swimmer, who specialized in sprint freestyle events. Thom qualified for the men's 100 m freestyle at the 2004 Summer Olympics in Athens, by receiving a Universality place from FINA, in an entry time of 54.14. He challenged seven other swimmers in heat two, including three-time Olympian Aleksandr Agafonov of Uzbekistan. He earned a sixth spot in 55.24, more than a second off his entry time. Thom failed to advance into the semifinals, as he placed fifty-ninth overall out of 71 swimmers in the preliminaries.

Major results

Individual

Long course

References

1984 births
Living people
Guyanese male freestyle swimmers
Olympic swimmers of Guyana
Swimmers at the 2004 Summer Olympics
Pan American Games competitors for Guyana
Swimmers at the 2003 Pan American Games
Commonwealth Games competitors for Guyana
Swimmers at the 2006 Commonwealth Games
Competitors at the 2002 South American Games
People from Linden, Guyana